Marine Aerial Refueler Transport Squadron 234 (VMGR-234) is a reserve United States Marine Corps KC-130J squadron.  They are a part of Marine Aircraft Group 41 (MAG-41), 4th Marine Aircraft Wing (4th MAW) and provide both fixed-wing and rotary-wing aerial refueling capabilities to support Marine Forces Reserve air operations in addition to assault air transport of personnel, equipment, and supplies. The squadron, known as the "Rangers" is stationed at Naval Air Station Joint Reserve Base Fort Worth, Texas.

History

World War II

Marine Scout Bomber Squadron 234 (VMSB-234) was activated at Marine Corps Air Station Ewa on May 1, 1942.  The squadron departed for Espiritu Santo in December 1942 and began their first combat tour as part of the Cactus Air Force on Guadalcanal on January 28, 1943.  Their second stint on Guadalcanal began on April 15, 1943.  During this time they did patrol duties in the Fiji Islands and also provided close air support in New Georgia.  They moved to Munda and began operating from there in October 1943 concentrating their attacks in the vicinity of Bougainville.  In November 1943 the squadron had moved to Efate and from there they returned to the United States.

They relocated to Marine Corps Air Station Miramar, California in November 1943 and were redesignated Marine Torpedo Bombing Squadron 234 (VMTB-234) on October 14, 1944. They were paired with VMF-513 during their deployment but never saw combat as the war ended. The squadron returned to California in November 1945 and was deactivated at Marine Corps Air Station El Toro on March 20, 1946.

Late 1940s through the 1960s
In January 1946, VMTB-234 was reassigned to Marine Aircraft Group 46 of the 4th Marine Aircraft Wing at MCAS El Toro, California.  The squadron was deactivated on March 20, 1946.  On July 1, 1947, the unit was reactivated as VMF-234, at Naval Air Station San Diego, California, and later moved to NAS Twin Cities in Minneapolis.  During the Korean War, many of squadron's personnel were recalled to active duty and assigned to other squadrons, leaving VMF-234 as a paper squadron in Minneapolis.

The 1950s were a decade of constant change for the squadron, as it was transformed into an attack squadron (VMA-234) with the transition to the F9F Panther in February 1955; then the Douglas AD-5 Skyraider in May 1958; and the Fairchild C-119F Flying Boxcar in December 1961.  After trading the Skyraider for Flying Boxcars, the unit was re-designated as Marine Transport Squadron 234 (VMR-234) on January 1, 1962.

1970s through the 1980s
In 1970, the unit moved to NAS Glenview, Illinois.  Five years later, they traded the C-119F Packets for the KC-130F Hercules.  The “Thundering Herd” received its current squadron designation, Marine Aerial Refueler Transport Squadron 234 (VMGR-234), on October 23, 1983.

In December 1986, VMGR-234 became the first Marine squadron to land an aircraft on an ice runway, transporting supplies to McMurdo Station, Antarctica.  In April 1988, a submarine, the USS Bonefish required assistance off the Florida coast.  With the new nickname “Bears,” from the local Chicago major league football team, VMGR-234 flew flotation equipment to NAS Norfolk, Virginia and NAS Newport, Florida, getting off the ground in less than an hour.

1990s
In January 1991, the squadron was activated in support of the Gulf War, but remained at Naval Air Station Glenview.  Aircraft from VMGR-234 deployed to the Persian Gulf for Operation Desert Storm, and the squadron remained on active duty until May 1991.  In August 1994, the squadron was reassigned to Marine Aircraft Group 41 at Naval Air Station Joint Reserve Base Fort Worth, Texas.  On October 22, 1995, the unit surpassed 73,000 accident free flight hours.

In 2000, VMGR-234 flew a variety support missions on six different continents for both active and reserve components.  Changing their nickname again, the Rangers were deployed for a total of 717 days. In one calendar year alone the squadron flew a total of 1,691 sorties.

Global War on Terror

In 2003, VMGR-234 deployed to Bahrain and Kuwait to support Operation Iraqi Freedom.  During the initial weeks of the invasion, the Rangers averaged roughly 25 combat sorties and 60 hours of flight time per day.  The Rangers began their retrograde back to NAS-JRB Fort Worth, Texas, in September of that year.  The squadron flew a total of 3,435 combat flight hours and 2,059 combat sorties in 2003.

In 2004 the squadron was deployed to Al Asad, Iraq as part of a co-operative cycle of Marine VMGR squadrons constantly in support of the war in Iraq. 234 was deployed from March to October 2004 with VMGR-352 and VMGR-452.

Current Operations
In 2005, VMGR-234 flew critical supplies to the gulf coast in support of JTF Katrina.  From 2007 to 2011, the Rangers participated in numerous exercises in Morocco, Thailand, Romania, Norway, and the Philippines while supporting JIATF-S, 160th SOAR, 4th MAW and numerous other agencies.  From 2011 to present, VMGR-234 has deployed in support of Operation Unified Protectorate, SPMAGTF-AF, SPMAGTF-BSRF, SPMAGTF-CR and ISO RFF-1200.

See also
 United States Marine Corps Aviation
 List of active United States Marine Corps aircraft squadrons
 List of inactive United States Marine Corps aircraft squadrons

Notes

References

Bibliography

Web

 VMGR-234's official website

Military units and formations in Texas
KC-130
4th Marine Aircraft Wing